Jeremy Schaap  is an American sportswriter, television reporter and author. Schaap is an 11-time Emmy Awards winner for his work on ESPN's E:60, SportsCenter, and Outside the Lines.

Biography
He is a regular contributor to Nightline and ABC World News Tonight and has been published in Sports Illustrated, ESPN The Magazine, Time, Parade, The Wall Street Journal, and  The New York Times.

Schaap has worked four major soccer events for ESPN as the network's lead reporter, including: the 2010 World Cup, Euro 2012, the 2014 World Cup, and Euro 2016.

A native and resident of New York City, Schaap is the author of Cinderella Man: James J. Braddock, Max Baer, and the Greatest Upset in Boxing History (Houghton Mifflin), a New York Times best-seller, and Triumph: The Untold Story of Jesse Owens and Hitler's Olympics.

Schaap is the son of the late journalist and broadcaster Dick Schaap. Like his father, Schaap is an alumnus of Cornell University and a former editor at The Cornell Daily Sun. Schaap was also a member of the Quill and Dagger society.

He won the Dick Schaap Award for Outstanding Writing at the 2005 Emmys, an award named after his father, for an Outside the Lines feature titled "Finding Bobby Fischer." Schaap and his wife have three children, two girls and a boy. .

References

External links
 Jeremy Schaap's ESPN Bio

Living people
American television reporters and correspondents
Cornell University alumni
ESPN people
American horse racing announcers
Journalists from New York City
American television sports anchors
Jewish American writers
Sportswriters from New York (state)
Year of birth missing (living people)